Arouva mirificana is a species of snout moth in the genus Arouva. It was described by Francis Walker in 1864, and is known from Brazil.

References

Moths described in 1864
Chrysauginae
Moths of South America